The Beechcraft XA-38 "Grizzly" was a World War II-era ground attack aircraft, developed by Beechcraft, but never put into production. The Grizzly was to have been fitted with a forward-firing 75 mm cannon to penetrate heavily armored targets.

While the first prototype flew on 7 May 1944, testing established that the type would not be ready for the projected invasion of Japan. It also featured the Wright R-3350 engines already in use with the Boeing B-29 Superfortress—which had priority. Consequently, the XA-38 was canceled after a second prototype had been completed.

Design and development
The United States Army Air Forces awarded the Beech Aircraft Corporation a contract in December 1942 for two prototypes for their Model 28 "Destroyer".  to give a powerful ground attack aircraft to replace the Douglas A-20 Havoc, with the ability to hit "hardened" targets like tanks and bunkers and to attack coastal shipping. This capability was achieved through a 75 mm cannon with 20 rounds, mounted in a fixed position on the nose as well as two .50 cal (12.7 mm) M2 Browning machine guns firing forward. Defensive armament consisted of remotely controlled ventral and dorsal turrets, each armed with twin .50 cal (12.7 mm) machine guns. There were to be two crew members, a pilot and an observer/gunner in the rear cabin, using periscope sights to aim the guns.

Testing
On 7 May 1944, Beech test pilot Vern Carstens flew the XA-38 on its maiden flight from the company's Wichita airfield. The aircraft proved satisfactory in all respects and better than expected in some, including top speed.

During testing, the XA-38 prototypes were flown by USAAF pilots and serviced by military personnel, proving to be reliable and establishing a high level of serviceability.

The armament proved especially effective; if not for a shift in wartime priorities in 1944, the aircraft would most likely have been ordered in quantity even though the B-29 had priority for the Wright R-3350 engines. Instead, one prototype was scrapped and the other, intended for the USAF Museum, had an unknown fate.

Specifications

See also

References

Further reading

External links

 USAF Museum: XA-38 Grizzly

A-038
Beechcraft A-38 Grizzly
Cancelled military aircraft projects of the United States
Aircraft first flown in 1944
Mid-wing aircraft
Twin piston-engined tractor aircraft